Auris may refer to:

 Auris, Isère, a town in France
 Auris, a snail genus, catalogued by George Washington Tryon
 Toyota Auris, an automobile
 Ear (Latin)
 Auris, the first ocean-going merchant ship powered by a gas turbine

See also
 Auri (disambiguation)